Pratapsinh is a male given name. Notable people with the name include:

Prabhatsinh Pratapsinh Chauhan (born 1941), Indian politician
Pratapsinh Jadhav (born 1945), Indian journalist
Pratapsinh Mohite-Patil (1955–2015), Indian politician

Indian masculine given names